Aman Dangat, also known as "Kenan", was a powerful Mangpus of the town of Malakdang in the island of Sabtang in Batanes, Philippines who had led a revolt against the Spaniards from 1785 to 1791.

Revolt against Spain

Founding of the province
In 1782, Governor-General José Basco y Vargas sent an expedition in Batanes island and formally subjects the Ivatan people under the Spanish King. Spanish rule was then established in Batanes island on June 26, 1783, and Joseph Huelva y Melgarejo as the first governor of the island and the new province was named Provincia de la Concepcion. Aman Dangat continues to govern his people as a chieftain as per indigenous custom laws.

Resistance to policies
For easier administration of the people, the villagers of Sabtang and Vuhus were then transferred in San Vicente and San Felix in the town of Ivana in 1785 and it was at this year Aman Dangat first got into trouble with the Spanish authorities as he asked why he should follow Spanish policies. He defied the Spanish policies and initially it was a show of force as he probed the weaknesses and strength of the Spanish authorities. In 1789, the third governor of Batanes Joaquin del Castillo decreed that the Ivatans should live in the newly laid towns, change their costumes and customs and adopt the Spanish government system and obey the law by means of obedience to the governor as king's representative. He felt that the decree has offended him as he was the chieftain of Malakdang. He and about 150 men surrounded the mission house of Dominican priest Fr. Bartolome Artiguez demanding to know if the governor has a plan to arrest him and the priest assured that there was no such plan. He also asked Governor del Castillo and the governor assured him that there was no such plan and told him that he should not hesitate to appeal to the governor if he felt unfairly treated in any way .

Uprising and death
In 1791, non-Ivatan Filipinos working under Spanish government took from Aman Dangat's people supplies and timber without just compensation, he protested to the governor but instead, his men were chained. Under his leadership, he organized an uprising. Over a hundred men from Sabtang joined him in a revolt and seven government agents were killed.The Spanish authorities have overpowered Aman Dangat's force and were outnumbered by the stronger Spanish forces. Most of his men were killed and convicted.

Aman Dangat, a powerful chieftain and a leader fighting for the rights and freedom of the natives, was hanged in public in September 1791 in the town of Basco, Batanes. Before his execution, he was baptized and was named Buenaventura.

The people of Sabtang was then immediately ordered to settle in San Vicente and San Felix in the town of Ivana in Batan Island.

References

Civilians who were court-martialed
Anti-Spanish sentiment
Filipino Resistance activists
Filipino revolutionaries